Afronycteris is a genus of vesper bat containing two species, both of which are found in sub-Saharan Africa. Its members were previously classified in Neoromicia before phylogenetic analysis found them to comprise a separate genus. 

There are two species in this genus:

 Heller's serotine, Afronycteris helios
 Banana serotine, Afronycteris nanus

References 

Afronycteris
Bat genera